John Percy Nields (August 7, 1868 – August 26, 1943) was a United States district judge of the United States District Court for the District of Delaware.

Early life and education
Born in Wilmington, Delaware, Nields received an Artium Baccalaureus degree from Harvard College in 1889 and a Bachelor of Laws from Harvard Law School in 1892.

Career
Nields worked in private practice in Wilmington from 1892 to 1903. He was the United States attorney for the District of Delaware from 1903 to 1916, thereafter returning to private practice in Wilmington in 1930. He was a captain in the United States Army Ordnance Corps during World War II in 1918.

Federal judicial service
On June 20, 1930, Nields was nominated by President Herbert Hoover to a seat on the United States District Court for the District of Delaware vacated by Judge Hugh M. Morris. Nields was confirmed by the United States Senate on July 3, 1930, and received his commission the same day. He assumed senior status on September 30, 1941, serving in that capacity until his death on August 26, 1943, in Nahant, Massachusetts.

References

Sources

1868 births
1943 deaths
United States Attorneys for the District of Delaware
Judges of the United States District Court for the District of Delaware
United States district court judges appointed by Herbert Hoover
20th-century American judges
United States Army officers
Harvard Law School alumni